

The Harmon Mister America was a 1970s American single-seat light sports aircraft designed by James B. Harmon. Plans for home building were made available from the Harmon Engineering Company. It is a mid-wing cantilever monoplane with a low-set tailplane and a fixed-tailwheel landing gear. The prototype (N7UN) first flew in 1975 powered by a 60-hp (45 kW) 1200cc Volkswagen air-cooled engine.

Operational history
In November 2014 one example was registered in the United States with the Federal Aviation Administration.

Specifications

References

 Aircraft World Directory

Harmon Engineering aircraft
1970s United States sport aircraft
Homebuilt aircraft
Single-engined tractor aircraft
Mid-wing aircraft
Aircraft first flown in 1975